Oliver is an unincorporated community in Kimball County, Nebraska, United States.

History
Oliver was a station on the Union Pacific Railroad. The community was named for Oliver Ames, a railroad official.

References

Unincorporated communities in Kimball County, Nebraska
Unincorporated communities in Nebraska